Dempster is an 'L' station on the CTA's Purple Line at 1316 Sherman Place in Evanston, Illinois (directional coordinates 1300 north, 800 west).

The current station has been in place since 1910. A 1991 CTA budget crisis almost precipitated the station's closure, but the CTA decided to keep it open. Dempster is now one of the stations on the CTA's 2004-2008 Capital Improvement Plan.

Bus connections
CTA
 206 Evanston Circulator (school days only)
Pace
 213 Green Bay Road (Monday–Saturday only)

Notes and references

Notes

References

External links 

 Train schedule (PDF) at CTA official site
  Dempster (Evanston Line) Station Page
 Dempster Station Page CTA official site
 Dempster Street Station Sherman Avenue entrance from Google Maps Street View

CTA Purple Line stations
Railway stations in Evanston, Illinois
Railway stations in the United States opened in 1908
1908 establishments in Illinois